A blue laser is a laser that emits electromagnetic radiation with a wavelength 360–480nm, which the human eye sees as blue or violet.

Blue laser may also refer to:

 Blue Laser, an evil organization from the Cheat Commandos cartoon series

See also
 Blu-ray, a digital optical disc data storage format
 Blues and Lasers, an American band
 Laser (disambiguation)